Coelogyne vermicularis is a species of orchid in the genus Coelogyne.

External links

vermicularis